Ningwu Railway may refer to three Chinese railways:

Nanjing–Wuhu Railway, also known as the Ningwu Railway
Ningwu–Jingle Railway, entirely in Shanxi, also known as the Ningjing Railway
Ningwu–Kelan Railway, entirely in Shanxi, also known as the Ningke Railway